Hotline Communications Limited (HCL) was a software company founded in 1997, based in Toronto, Canada, with employees also in the United States and Australia. Hotline Communications' main activity was the publishing and distribution of a multi-purpose client/server communication software product named Hotline Connect, informally called, simply, Hotline. Initially, Hotline Communications sought a wide audience for its products, and organizations as diverse as Avid Technology, Apple Computer Australia, and public high schools used Hotline. At its peak, Hotline received millions of dollars in venture capital funding, grew to employ more than fifty people, served millions of users, and won accolades at trade shows and in newspapers and computer magazines around the world.

Hotline eventually attracted more of an "underground" community, which saw it as an easier to use successor to the Internet Relay Chat (IRC) community. In 2001 Hotline Communications lost the bulk of its VC funding, and went out of business later that month.  All of its assets were acquired in 2002 by Hotsprings, Inc., a new company formed by some ex-employees and shareholders. Hotsprings Inc. has since also abandoned development of the Hotline Connect software suite; the last iteration of Hotline Connect was released in December 2003. Currently, only a few servers and trackers remain but the Hotline community is still alive.

History
Hotline was designed in 1996 and known as "hotwire" by Australian programmer Adam Hinkley (known online by his username, "Hinks"), then 17 years old, as a classic Mac OS application. The source code for the Hotline applications was based on a class library, "AppWarrior" (AW), which Hinkley wrote. AppWarrior would later become litigious, as Hinkley wrote parts of it while he was employed by an Australian company, Redrock Holdings. Six other fans of Hotline, David Murphy, Alex King, Phil Hilton, Jason Roks, David Bordin, and Terrance Gregory, joined Adam Hinkley's efforts to promote and market the Hotline programs, working day and night and using the company's own products to stay in touch from across the US, Canada, and Australia. Eventually, Canadian Jason Roks approached Adam Hinkley and encouraged him to move to Toronto, where Hotline Communications, Ltd. was incorporated. In 1997, Hotline won a "Best of the Show" award from one of the award ceremonies concurrent with the Boston MacWorld Expo. It received accolades in computer magazines and the mainstream press from Macworld Sweden (which awarded it a "Golden Mouse Award") to the Los Angeles Times, which called it one of the "best kept secrets on the internet", as well as a short article in Wired Magazine's September 1997 issue. At the time, the company's main objective was to release a stable Windows-compatible version to reach a wider audience.

However, a few months after Hinkley moved to Canada, he and his colleagues at Hotline Communications got into a major disagreement and Hinkley left the firm, encrypting source files for Hotline on Hotline Communication's computers, thus crippling the company. Lawsuits against Hinkley were filed by both Hotline Communications and Redrock, and Hinkley lost copyright of his "AppWarrior" library as well as rights over the "Hotline" software. The legal battle and Hinkley's case drew some media attention, especially on the Internet.

In the late 1990s, when Hotline's popularity was at its peak, thousands of Hotline servers were available, catering to a wide variety of user interests, including pornography, MP3s, and pirated software; it was these underground purposes that drew the majority of media attention. To access these files most Hotline servers required a login and password. The password was often obtainable by visiting a website provided by the server admin and clicking on a banner advertisement. Server admins would earn money per click and in return offer pirated software, music, movies and pornography to users.

At the end of the 1990s, by then outdated Hotline software started to gradually fade, as peer-to-peer systems like Gnutella and Kazaa became increasingly popular. Many early Hotline users felt sympathy for Hinkley and viewed Hotline Communications with a bad eye and the Hotline Connect suite did not sell well.  In September 2001, Hotline Communications announced development of version 2.0 of the Hotline suite had been stopped, beta versions of which had not been well received by the community, and laid off most of its employees. In mid-October of the same year, the company announced the re-hire of their engineering team "in anticipation of the release of Hotline 2.0" on their website (offline as of May 2006). However, no stable build  of Hotline 2.0 was ever released.

As of February 2022, hltracker.com and tracked.stickytack.com continue to provide tracker services for Hotline clients.

Hotline Connect software suite

The Hotline applications were distributed as shareware and combined chat, message board and file transfer capabilities and operated using a client/server (not peer-to-peer) model.  Hotline predates the Napster and Gnutella file sharing products. The Hotline protocol was a binary protocol which accounted for its high speed efficient transfers in the days when most internet users still used modems and dialup. The protocol was reverse engineered by the internet community, leading to a wide variety of third-party clients being written in RealBasic, one of the few easy-to-use development environments available on the Macintosh at the time.

Hotline Connect consisted of three applications, distributed separately (via Internet download or on promotional CDs):
 Hotline Client: an application used to access Hotline servers set up by users running the Hotline Server software. Hotline Connect users with a client installed could connect to servers they knew using the host's IP address.
 Hotline Server: an easy-to-configure server application.
 Hotline Tracker: a name server, used to keep track of the IP addresses of several Hotline servers.

Hotline successors
A company named Haxial Software (rumored to be Adam Hinkley) released a Hotline-like product named KDX.

Jörn and Mirko Hartmann released similar software deliberately kept Mac-only called Carracho in 1998 Carracho GbR - Welcome, still used today by a small, tight-knit group of users. There have also been several third-party applications that implement the Hotline protocol.

There have been several open-source versions of the Hotline Client and Server suite, which were not based on the official source code, and provide several protocol enhancements (also known as HOPE - HOtline Protocol Extension).
Some versions also support an IRC bridge or KDX bridge. Most of the work on the Hotline enhancements have been done by r0r (HOPE, KDX), kang (IRC) and Devin Teske. See Darknet for details.

Hotline's largest community Mixed Blood, started by Prime Chuck and SAINT in 1998, is still active to this day on Wired. Wired is similar to Hotline and developed by Zanka software.

Another very large hotline server of the same time, Not All Mine, or notallmine.net, converted to HTML format and went private around 2006.

Modern clients (constantly being updated)
 Pitbull Pro, a remake of the original OS9/X client (Windows)

Open source clients
 Fidelio - open-source Hotline client, no longer updated since 2002 (Linux/Unix)
 mhxd - open-source Hotline server and client
 synhxd - open-source Hotline server and client
 gtkhx - open-source Hotline client, no longer updated since 2001 (Linux/Unix)

References

Company and product history
 "Wayback Machine search results for 'bigredh.com'", Internet Archive Wayback Machine. Accessed on April 7, 2005. — A chronicle of the different versions of the bigredh.com website. "BigRedH.com" was Hotline Communication's website and e-commerce platform from June 2001 on. E-commerce "service provider" Digital River designed the original website (Digital River press release).
 "Wayback Machine search results for 'hotspringsinc.com'", Internet Archive Wayback Machine. Accessed on April 7, 2005. — A chronicle of the different versions of the hotspringsinc.com website.
 "Macworld Hotline Revisited Article
 "Hotline – The Glory Days of P2P"

Legal battle
 "Hotline's Civil War" , Salon.com Archive. Accessed on February 26, 1999.
 "Employment Law, Intellectual Property Law and the New Economy" (radio program transcript), The Law Report (website), Australian Broadcasting Corporation Radio National (website). Accessed April 7, 2005. — Discussion of the Hotline vs. Hinkley legal battle in the broader context of intellectual property law in Australia.
 "Adam Hinkley's IP Hindsights", Slashdot.org. Accessed on April 7, 2005. — Slashdot discussion about original Hotline programmer Adam Hinkley's legal battle against his former Hotline Communications, Ltd. associates.
 "Redrock Holdings Pty Ltd & Hotline Communications Ltd & Ors v Hinkley (2001) VSC 91 (4 April 2001)", Text of the 2001 Victoria Supreme Court judgement assigning ownership of Hotline Connect to Hotline Communications.

Defunct software companies of Canada
Online chat
Internet forums
File sharing communities
File sharing networks
1997 establishments in Ontario
Canadian companies established in 1997